New York's 6th State Senate district is one of 63 districts in the New York State Senate. It has been represented by Democrat Kevin Thomas since 2019. Thomas was first elected in 2018, defeating longtime Republican incumbent Kemp Hannon.

Geography
District 6 is located in central Nassau County on Long Island. It includes portions of the town of Hempstead including the villages of Hempstead and Garden City, and the hamlets of Levittown, East Meadow, and stretches into southern Oyster Bay including the hamlets of Plainedge and Bethpage.

The district overlaps with New York's 2nd, 3rd, and 4th congressional districts, and with the 9th, 14th, 15th, 17th, 18th, 19th, 21st, and 22nd districts of the New York State Assembly.

Recent election results

2020

2018

2016

2014

2012

Federal results in District 6

References

06